The Royal Australian Armoured Corps Memorial and Army Tank Museum is located at Puckapunyal, an Australian Army training facility and base 10 km west of Seymour, in central Victoria, south-eastern Australia.  The base is the home of the Royal Australian Armoured Corps.

Collection 
The museum features over 80 armoured fighting vehicles on outdoor and indoor display, and uniforms, weapons, medals, artefacts and memorabilia of the Royal Australian Armoured Corps and its predecessor cavalry units.

Gallery

See also 
 The Australian Armour and Artillery Museum

References

External links

 Royal Australian Armoured Corps Memorial and Tank Museum

Tank museums
Military and war museums in Australia
Transport museums in Victoria (Australia)